This is a list of rural localities in Orenburg Oblast. Orenburg Oblast (Orenburgskaya oblast) is a federal subject of Russia (an oblast). Its administrative center is the city of Orenburg. From 1938 to 1957, it bore the name Chkalov Oblast in honor of Valery Chkalov. Population: 2,033,072 (2010 Census).

Abdulinsky District 
Rural localities in Abdulinsky District:

 Abdrakhmanovo

Adamovsky District 
Rural localities in Adamovsky District:

 Adamovka

Akbulaksky District 
Rural localities in Akbulaksky District:

 Akbulak
 Sagarchin

Alexandrovsky District 
Rural localities in Alexandrovsky District:

 Alexandrovka

Asekeyevsky District 
Rural localities in Asekeyevsky District:

 Asekeyevo

Belyayevsky District 
Rural localities in Belyayevsky District:

 Belyayevka

Dombarovsky District 
Rural localities in Dombarovsky District:

 Dombarovsky

Grachyovsky District 
Rural localities in Grachyovsky District:

 Grachyovka

Ileksky District 
Rural localities in Ileksky District:

 Ilek

Komarovsky 
Rural localities in Komarovsky urban okrug:

 Komarovsky

Krasnogvardeysky District 
Rural localities in Krasnogvardeysky District:

 Pleshanovo

Kurmanayevsky District 
Rural localities in Kurmanayevsky District:

 Kurmanayevka

Kvarkensky District 
Rural localities in Kvarkensky District:

 Kvarkeno

Matveyevsky District 
Rural localities in Matveyevsky District:

 Matveyevka

Novoorsky District 
Rural localities in Novoorsky District:

 Novoorsk

Novosergiyevsky District 
Rural localities in Novosergiyevsky District:

 Novosergiyevka

Oktyabrsky District 
Rural localities in Oktyabrsky District:

 Oktyabrskoye

Perevolotsky District 
Rural localities in Perevolotsky District:

 Abramovka
 Perevolotsky

Pervomaysky District 
Rural localities in Pervomaysky District:

 Pervomaysky

Ponomaryovsky District 
Rural localities in Ponomaryovsky District:

 Ponomaryovka

Saraktashsky District 
Rural localities in Saraktashsky District:

 Saraktash

Severny District 
Rural localities in Severny District:

 Severnoye

Sharlyksky District 
Rural localities in Sharlyksky District:

 Sharlyk

Svetlinsky District 
Rural localities in Svetlinsky District:

 Svetly

Tashlinsky District 
Rural localities in Tashlinsky District:

 Tashla

Totsky District 
Rural localities in Totsky District:

 Totskoye

Tyulgansky District 
Rural localities in Tyulgansky District:

 Tyulgan

See also 

 
 Lists of rural localities in Russia

References 

Orenburg Oblast